Nitrogen dioxide is a chemical compound with the formula . It is one of several nitrogen oxides.  is an intermediate in the industrial synthesis of nitric acid, millions of tons of which are produced each year for use primarily in the production of fertilizers. At higher temperatures it is a reddish-brown gas. It can be fatal if inhaled in large quantities. Nitrogen dioxide is a paramagnetic, bent molecule with C2v point group symmetry.

It is included in the NOx family of atmospheric pollutants.

Properties 
Nitrogen dioxide is a reddish-brown gas with a pungent, acrid odor above , becomes a yellowish-brown liquid below , and converts to the colorless dinitrogen tetroxide below .

The bond length between the nitrogen atom and the oxygen atom is 119.7 pm. This bond length is consistent with a bond order between one and two.

Unlike ozone, O3, the ground electronic state of nitrogen dioxide is a doublet state, since nitrogen has one unpaired electron, which decreases the alpha effect compared with nitrite and creates a weak bonding interaction with the oxygen lone pairs. The lone electron in  also means that this compound is a free radical, so the formula for nitrogen dioxide is often written as •.

The reddish-brown color is a consequence of preferential absorption of light in the blue region of the spectrum (400 – 500 nm), although the absorption extends throughout the visible (at shorter wavelengths) and into the infrared (at longer wavelengths). Absorption of light at wavelengths shorter than about 400 nm results in photolysis (to form NO + O, atomic oxygen); in the atmosphere the addition of the oxygen atom so formed to O2 results in ozone.

Preparation

Nitrogen dioxide typically arises via the oxidation of nitric oxide by oxygen in air (e.g. as result of corona discharge):

NO +   → 

Nitrogen dioxide is formed in most combustion processes using air as the oxidant. At elevated temperatures nitrogen combines with oxygen to form nitric oxide:
  +  → 

In the laboratory,  can be prepared in a two-step procedure where dehydration of nitric acid produces dinitrogen pentoxide:

6  +   → 3  + 2 

which subsequently undergoes thermal decomposition:
 → 2  +  

The thermal decomposition of some metal nitrates also generates :
 → PbO + 2  +  

 is generated by the reduction of concentrated nitric acid with a metal (such as copper):

Formation from decomposition of nitric acid 
Nitric acid decomposes slowly to nitrogen dioxide by the overall reaction:
 +  
The nitrogen dioxide so formed confers the characteristic yellow color often exhibited by this acid.

Selected reactions

Thermal properties
 exists in equilibrium with the colourless gas dinitrogen tetroxide:
2   

NO2 is favored at higher temperatures, while at lower temperatures, N2O4 predominates.  can be obtained as a white solid with melting point −11.2 °C. NO2 is paramagnetic due to its unpaired electron, while N2O4 is diamagnetic.

At 150 °C,  decomposes with release of oxygen via an endothermic process:
 →  +

As an oxidizer 
As suggested by the weakness of the N–O bond,  is a good oxidizer. Consequently, it will combust, sometimes explosively, in the presence of hydrocarbons.

Hydrolysis
NO2 reacts with water to give nitric acid and nitrous acid:

This reaction is one of the steps in the Ostwald process for the industrial production of nitric acid from ammonia. This reaction is negligibly slow at low concentrations of NO2 characteristic of the ambient atmosphere, although it does proceed upon NO2 uptake to surfaces. Such surface reaction is thought to produce gaseous HNO2 (often written as HONO) in outdoor and indoor environments.

Conversion to nitrates
 is used to generate anhydrous metal nitrates from the oxides:
MO + 3  →  + NO

Alkyl and metal iodides give the corresponding nitrates:

Ecology
 is introduced into the environment by natural causes, including entry from the stratosphere, bacterial respiration, volcanos, and lightning. These sources make  a trace gas in the atmosphere of Earth, where it plays a role in absorbing sunlight and regulating the chemistry of the troposphere, especially in determining ozone concentrations.

Uses
 is used as an intermediate in the manufacturing of nitric acid, as a nitrating agent in manufacturing of chemical explosives, as a polymerization inhibitor for acrylates, as a flour bleaching agent, and as a room temperature sterilization agent. It is also used as an oxidizer in rocket fuel, for example in red fuming nitric acid; it was used in the Titan rockets, to launch Project Gemini, in the maneuvering thrusters of the Space Shuttle, and in unmanned space probes sent to various planets.

Human-caused sources and exposure

Outdoors,  can be a result of traffic from motor vehicles.

Indoors, exposure arises from cigarette smoke, and butane and kerosene heaters and stoves.

Workers in industries where  is used are also exposed and are at risk for occupational lung diseases, and NIOSH has set exposure limits and safety standards. Workers in high voltage areas especially those with spark or plasma creation are at risk. Agricultural workers can be exposed to  arising from grain decomposing in silos; chronic exposure can lead to lung damage in a condition called "silo-filler's disease".

Toxicity

 diffuses into the epithelial lining fluid (ELF) of the respiratory epithelium and dissolves. There, it chemically reacts with antioxidant and lipid molecules in the ELF.

Acute harm due to  exposure is rare.100–200 ppm can cause mild irritation of the nose and throat, 250–500 ppm can cause edema, leading to bronchitis or pneumonia, and levels above 1000 ppm can cause death due to asphyxiation from fluid in the lungs. There are often no symptoms at the time of exposure other than transient cough, fatigue or nausea, but over hours inflammation in the lungs causes edema.

For skin or eye exposure, the affected area is flushed with saline. For inhalation, oxygen is administered, bronchodilators may be administered, and if there are signs of methemoglobinemia, a condition that arises when nitrogen-based compounds affect the hemoglobin in red blood cells, methylene blue may be administered.

It is classified as an extremely hazardous substance in the United States as defined in Section 302 of the U.S. Emergency Planning and Community Right-to-Know Act (42 U.S.C. 11002), and it is subject to strict reporting requirements by facilities which produce, store, or use it in significant quantities.

Health effects of  exposure 

Even small day-to-day variations in  can cause changes in lung function. 
Chronic exposure to  can cause respiratory effects including airway inflammation in healthy people and increased respiratory symptoms in people with asthma.

The influence of indoor air pollutants on health is important because the majority of people in the world spend more than 80% of their time indoors. The amount of time spent indoors depends upon on several factors including geographical region, job activities, and gender among other variables. With respect to geographic region, the prevalence of asthma has ranged from 2 to 20% with no clear indication as to what's driving the difference. This may be a result of the "hygiene hypothesis" or "western lifestyle" that captures the notions of homes that are well insulated and with fewer inhabitants. Another study examined the relationship between nitrogen exposure in the home and respiratory symptoms  and found a statistically significant odds ratio of 2.23 (95% CI: 1.06, 4.72) among those with a medical diagnosis of asthma and gas stove exposure.

Research has shown that children with asthma who live in homes with gas stoves have greater risk of respiratory symptoms such as wheezing, cough and chest tightness. Additionally, gas stove use was associated with reduced lung function in girls with asthma, although this association was not found in boys. Using ventilation when operating gas stoves may reduce the risk of respiratory symptoms in children with asthma.

The study concluded that higher levels of  within a home were linked to a greater level of respiratory symptoms among the study population. This further exemplifies that  toxicity is dangerous for children.

Environmental effects 
Elevated levels of  can also harm vegetation, decreasing growth, and reduce crop yields.

See also
 Dinitrogen tetroxide
 Nitrite
 Nitrous oxide – "laughing gas", a linear molecule, isoelectronic with  but with a nonsymmetric arrangement of atoms (NNO)
 Nitryl

References

Cited sources

External links

International Chemical Safety Card 0930
National Pollutant Inventory – Oxides of nitrogen fact sheet
NIOSH Pocket Guide to Chemical Hazards
WHO-Europe reports: Health Aspects of Air Pollution (2003) (PDF) and "Answer to follow-up questions from CAFE (2004) (PDF)
Nitrogen Dioxide Air Pollution
Current global map of nitrogen dioxide distribution
A review of the acute and long term impacts of exposure to nitrogen dioxide in the United Kingdom IOM Research Report TM/04/03

Nitrogen oxides
Bleaches
Hazardous air pollutants
Smog
Free radicals
Food additives
Gases with color